Tigrosa annexa is a species of wolf spider (Lycosidae) native to eastern North America from Texas, east to Florida, and north to Ohio.

References

Lycosidae
Spiders of the United States
Spiders described in 1944